Albin Dukowski (born 4 June 1954) is a Canadian sprinter. He competed in the men's 4 × 100 metres relay at the 1976 Summer Olympics.  He won a bronze medal in the 1975 Pan American Games 4 × 100 metres relay (with Hugh Fraser, Marvin Nash, and Bob Martin).

References

External links
 

1954 births
Living people
Athletes (track and field) at the 1976 Summer Olympics
Canadian male sprinters
Olympic track and field athletes of Canada
Athletes (track and field) at the 1975 Pan American Games
Pan American Games bronze medalists for Canada
Pan American Games medalists in athletics (track and field)
Athletes from Vancouver
Medalists at the 1975 Pan American Games
Universiade medalists in athletics (track and field)
Universiade silver medalists for Canada
21st-century Canadian people
20th-century Canadian people